Veriya is also known as Bedia or Vediya. Veriya villages are located in chitalwana tehsil of Jalore district. Veriya is 50 km from Tehsil headquarter and 196 km from District headquarter. Here the village panchayat is Bhimguga. Veriya village is the important village of Chitalwana tehsil. From here, the Border Roads Organization passes through the National Highway 15. The population of this village is 1611. The lady of this village Nenu Devi Bhimguda has been the first woman Sarpanch of the Gram Panchayat. Junjaram Thory from here is popular as the youngest digital entrepreneur and news personality. There are four schools in the field of education, out of which 3 are private and one government school. The people of the village are mostly farmers.

School list 
 Govt. Upper Primary School
 Jasnath Public High School
 Sarswati Bal Niketan High School
 Mahadev Vidhyapeeth High School

References 

Villages in Jalore district